The Ocean State Rivalry is an American college basketball rivalry between the Providence Friars and Rhode Island Rams. The Ocean State Rivalry is thought to be a competitive college basketball rivalry in the New England region, though Providence has won 9 of the last 11 games. It is the biggest game of the year on the schedule for Rhode Island. It is also a crucial game for the Ocean State Cup. The name of the rivalry comes from the nickname of the State of Rhode Island which is the Ocean State.

History 
The Providence Friars and the Rhode Island Rams have met 133 times since the 1933-34 college basketball season. The Ocean State Rivalry game is usually played in December, and the venue alternates between the Amica Mutual Pavilion in Downtown Providence in odd-numbered years and the Ryan Center on the campus of the University of Rhode Island in Kingston in even-numbered years. Providence leads the series 75–58.

Game results

See also 

 Ocean State Cup

References 

Providence Friars men's basketball
Rhode Island Rams men's basketball
1920 establishments in Rhode Island
College basketball rivalries in the United States